George William Foote (11 January 1850 – 17 October 1915) was an English secularist, freethinker, republican, writer and journal editor.

Early life
George William Foote was born in Plymouth, the son of William Thomas Foot (a customs officer) and Ann Winzar.

Career
In his Reminiscences of Charles Bradlaugh he recalls coming to London in January 1868 with "plenty of health and very little religion". He was taken to Cleveland Hall by a friend, and "heard Mrs. [Harriet] Law knock the Bible about delightfully. She was not what would be called a woman of culture, but she had what some devotees of 'culchaw' do not posses—a great deal of natural ability..."
A few weeks later Foote heard Charles Bradlaugh speaking at the hall.
He became involved with the secularism, freethought and republicanism, joining the Young Men's Secular Association, the National Secular Society, and contributing to Bradlaugh's National Reformer.

In 1877 Foote joined the anti-Bradlaughites in the breakaway British Secular Union. The split was caused by several factors: Bradlaugh's alleged autocratic style; Bradlaugh's association with Annie Besant; and Bradlaugh and Besant's involvement in promoting birth control and neo-Malthusianism. The BSU was relatively short-lived, and Foote himself was reconciled to Bradlaugh within a few years, becoming an NSS vice-president from 1882.

The Secularist: A Liberal Weekly Review (1876-1877), Foote's first attempt to launch his own publication, in collaboration with George Jacob Holyoake, did not last long. In May, 1881, Foote started a serial publication called The Freethinker, which is still published. As a result of contents of this journal, Foote was charged with blasphemy, and eventually imprisoned for one year with hard labour. On receiving his sentence from Mr Justice North (a devout Catholic), Foote said "with great deliberation" to the Judge "My Lord, I thank you; it is worthy of your creed". His description of this experience was published in 1886 as Prisoner for Blasphemy.

Once released, Foote continued to be active promoting his ideals, writing books and pamphlets, lecturing, and debating. Foote was well-versed in literature, and had extensive knowledge of ancient and contemporary writers, and ecclesiastical history. In 1890 Foote succeeded Bradlaugh as President of the National Secular Society and remained in that role for twenty-five years.

His death was related by Chapman Cohen in The Freethinker (31 October 1915):

When I saw him on the Friday (two days) before his death he said, "I have had another setback, but I am a curious fellow and may get all right again." But he looked the fact of death in the face with the same courage and determination that he faced Judge North many years ago. A few hours before he died he said calmly to those around him, "I am dying." And when the end came his head dropped back on the pillow, and with a quiet sigh, as of one falling to sleep, he passed away.

Publications
 Foote, George William (1879). Secularism, The True Philosophy of Life: An Exposition and a Defence. Reprint, London: GW Foote & Co., 2016. 
 Foote, George William (1885). The Jewish Life of Christ. London: Progressive Publishing Co.
 
 Foote, George William (1889). Secularism and Theosophy: A Rejoinder to Mrs. Besant's Pamphlet. London: Progressive Publishing Co.
 Foote, George William (1889). The New Cagliostro: An Open Letter to Madame Blavatsky. London: Progressive Publishing Co.

Notes

References

Further reading
 McGee, John Edwin (1948). A History of the British Secular Movement. Haldeman-Julius Publications.
 Herrick, Jim (1982). Vision and Realism: A Hundred Years of The Freethinker. London: GW Foote & Co. 
 Marsh, Joss (1998). Word crimes: Blasphemy, Culture, and Literature in Nineteenth-Century England. University of Chicago Press.

External links 

 
 
 
 More works by G. W. Foote at The Freethought Archives
 The Freethinker

1850 births
1915 deaths
19th-century atheists
19th-century English male writers
20th-century atheists
Anti-vivisectionists
British atheism activists
British secularists
Critics of Theosophy
English activists
English atheist writers
English atheists
English editors
English male non-fiction writers
English non-fiction writers
English prisoners and detainees
English republicans
English sceptics
Freethought writers
People convicted of blasphemy
Writers from Plymouth, Devon